The King's School, situated on Allington Lane in Fair Oak, Hampshire, is an independent Christian faith school with approximately 214 pupils as of 2019. The school was founded in 1987. Before moving into its current location, the school was located at Fishers Court, Fair Oak.

Current management
The school's current head teacher is Heather Bowden.

The previous head teacher, Paul Johnson, took over from Ruth Pierson in 2005. Ruth Pierson and Paul Trevett acted as temporary head teacher and deputy head teacher, respectively, when David Greenwood, the previous head teacher, left.

The primary school consists of the Quob Lane Christian Primary School and the Winchester Christian Primary School, set up initially by David and Catherine Greenwood in 1997. The mixing of the schools into The King's School was finalized in 2010. Due to the limited size of the location, the years are mixed (e.g. years 3 and 4 are one class).

Subjects
The King's School currently teaches the following subjects from years 7-9: English, Maths, Science, Spanish, Religious Studies, Music, Drama, Art, ICT, Geography, History, Physical education (PE) and Food Technology. Latin is taught from years 7-8 and then dropped from the timetable.

When pupils reach Year 10 they have the option to drop some subjects.

The compulsory subjects are English, Maths, Science, religious studies, one of the two languages available (Spanish and Latin) and ICT.

Academic performance
The school's performance in GCSE examinations is published every year. The school achieved 99.9% pass rate in core subjects at GCSE for the academic year 2006/2007.

Christianity in the King's School
The King's School is a Christian school, so it holds assemblies that cover topics of the Christian faith. For all assemblies apart from the House Prayers, there is the performance of Christian music by Year 11 students. Worship is held at the beginning of every assembly. Because of the school's Christian origin, religious studies is a compulsory subject throughout all years.

Extension (2006–2010)
The school underwent a large extension project between 2006 and 2010 which added many classrooms, two science labs, and a DT lab to the old building. The DT lab was converted into a "music room" in 2014 to be used for music lessons.

References

Private schools in Hampshire
Borough of Eastleigh
Christian schools in England